Roberto de Noya, O.P. or Roberto de Noja (died 1515) was a Roman Catholic prelate who served as Archbishop of Naxos (1504–1515), Bishop of Acerra (1497–1504),
and Bishop of Minervino Murge (1492–1497).

Biography
Roberto de Noya was born in the region of Apulia, Italy and ordained a priest in the Order of Preachers.
On 23 January 1492, he was appointed Bishop of Minervino Murge by Pope Innocent VIII.
On 15 March 1497, he was transferred to the diocese of Acerra by Pope Alexander VI.
On 15 April 1504, he was appointed by Pope Julius II as titular Archbishop of Naxos.
He held the title of Archbishop of Naxos until his death on 22 April 1515.

References

External links and additional sources
 (for Chronology of Bishops) 
 (for Chronology of Bishops) 
 (for Chronology of Bishops) 
 (for Chronology of Bishops) 
 (for Chronology of Bishops) 
 (for Chronology of Bishops) 

15th-century Italian Roman Catholic bishops
16th-century Roman Catholic bishops in the Republic of Venice
Bishops appointed by Pope Innocent VIII
Bishops appointed by Pope Alexander VI
Bishops appointed by Pope Julius II
1515 deaths
People from Apulia
Dominican bishops